Mogelsberg is a municipality in the Wahlkreis (constituency) of Toggenburg in the canton of St. Gallen in Switzerland.

Mogelsberg was an independent municipality until January 1, 2009, when it merged with Brunnadern and St. Peterzell to form the municipality of Neckertal.

See also
 Mogelsberg railway station

References

External links

 Official website 
 

Former municipalities of the canton of St. Gallen